Hajjiabad (also Romanized as Ḩājjīābād; also known as Ḩājjīābād-e Kohneh) is a village in Momenabad Rural District, in the Central District of Sarbisheh County, South Khorasan Province, Iran. At the 2006 census, its population was 20, in 8 families.

References 

Populated places in Sarbisheh County